Stéphane Viry (born 14 October 1969) is a French Republican politician who has represented Vosges's 1st constituency in the National Assembly since 2017.

References 

Living people
1969 births
People from Épinal
People from Vosges (department)
Politicians from Grand Est
21st-century French politicians
The Republicans (France) politicians
Deputies of the 15th National Assembly of the French Fifth Republic
Nancy-Université alumni
Deputies of the 16th National Assembly of the French Fifth Republic